Peter John Bickel (born 1940) is an American statistician and Professor of Statistics at the University of California, Berkeley.

Education and career
Bickel studied physics at the California Institute of Technology. He graduated from University of California, Berkeley, with a Ph.D., in 1963, where he studied under Erich Leo Lehmann.

His students include C.F. Jeff Wu, Jianqing Fan, Katerina Kechris, Elizaveta Levina, and Donald Andrews.

Personal
He married Nancy Kramer in 1964; they have two children.

Awards
1970 Guggenheim Fellow
1973 Fellow of the American Statistical Association
1981 the recipient of COPSS Presidents' Award
1984 MacArthur Fellow
1986 Fellow of the American Academy of Arts and Sciences
1986 Member of the National Academy of Sciences
1986 Honorary Doctorate degree from Hebrew University, Jerusalem
1995 Foreign member of the Royal Netherlands Academy of Arts and Sciences
2006 Commander of the Order of Orange-Nassau
2013 R. A. Fisher Lectureship
2014 Honorary Doctorate degree from ETH Zurich

References

Further reading

External links
 Homepage
 

1940 births
American statisticians
Romanian emigrants to the United States
California Institute of Technology alumni
University of California, Berkeley College of Letters and Science faculty
University of California, Berkeley alumni
MacArthur Fellows
Living people
Fellows of the American Academy of Arts and Sciences
Fellows of the American Statistical Association
Members of the Royal Netherlands Academy of Arts and Sciences
Members of the United States National Academy of Sciences
Presidents of the Institute of Mathematical Statistics
Commanders of the Order of Orange-Nassau
Mathematical statisticians